Bobby Jack Brazier (born 2 June 2003) is an English actor and model. In January 2020, he made his runway debut, modelling for Dolce & Gabbana at Milan Fashion Week and in September 2022, he joined the cast of the BBC One soap opera EastEnders as Freddie Slater.

Early life
Brazier was born on 2 June 2003 at Portland Hospital. He is the son of Jeff Brazier (b. 1979), a television presenter and Jade Goody (1981–2009), a television personality who was known for appearing on the reality series Big Brother. He is of English heritage on his father's side, while his mother was of Jamacian and English heritage. He and his younger brother Freddie (born 2004) were raised in Harlow, Essex; their mother died on 22 March 2009 from cervical cancer. Brazier and his brother did not attend Goody’s funeral due to the high media attention.

Career
Brazier was in the spotlight from birth due to his mother starring in her reality series on Sky Living from 2004 up until her death in 2009 In which Brazier and his brother Freddie would sporadically appear through the years. Following his mothers death Brazier and his brother did not appear in the spotlight. 

Brazier began his modelling career in 2019 at the age of 16 after he was scouted by Cesar Perin whilst walking down the street, who subsequently signed Brazier to his modelling agency Unsigned Group. He also worked at a milkshake café and began an apprenticeship after leaving school. In January 2020, Brazier made his runway debut, modelling for Dolce & Gabbana at Milan Fashion Week. He has since modelled at London Fashion Week and Paris Fashion Week, for magazines including Schon, MMScene, Odda and Man About Town as well as for Tommy Hilfiger.

In September 2022, Brazier appeared on screen for the first time in the cast of the BBC One soap opera EastEnders, taking over the role of Freddie Slater, the son of established character Little Mo Mitchell (Kacey Ainsworth), with the character last being seen as a baby.

Filmography

References

External links
 

2003 births
21st-century English actors
Living people
English male models
British child models
English male soap opera actors
English television actors
Male actors from Essex
People from Harlow
English people of Jamaican descent